The Mareza (Serbian Cyrillic: Мареза) is a river in Montenegro. It is also a name of suburb of Podgorica, in which the river originates.

The river
The River Mareza is a small river that originates at the Mareza Springs, some 3 km northwest of Podgorica's neighbourhood of Tološi. The Mareza Springs are the source of much of Podgorica's drinking water. It also provides water for the Mareza fish pond, an artificial pond created for fish breeding. From there on, the Mareza generally has a form of a small canal, and empties into the Morača just south of Podgorica.

The suburb
Mareza is also a name of a settlement around the Mareza Springs. It is a favourite excursion site of Podgorica citizens, partly because it has a few degrees lower temperature than Podgorica city in the summer months. It is also a home of one of the Plantaže restaurants, famed for its traditional Montenegrin cuisine. It is somewhat exclusive residential area, one of the residents being the former Mayor of Podgorica, Miomir Mugoša.

References

Rivers of Montenegro
Tourist attractions in Podgorica
Geography of Podgorica
Suburbs of Podgorica